Kumlutarla (also known as Adaf) is a village in the Baskil District of Elazığ Province in Turkey. The village is populated by Turkmens who adhere to Alevism and had a population of 49 in 2021.

The hamlet of Kuyucak is attached to the village.

References

Villages in Baskil District